Becker is one of the German-language surnames, along with Bäcker and Baecker, that derive from the  root, which refers to baking. The surname began as a name for a baker (and thus his family). In northern Germany, it can also derive from the word Beck for Bach ("creek" or "brook") to denote origin.

Geographical distribution
As of 2014, 55.3% of all known bearers of the surname Becker were residents of Germany (frequency 1:287), 24.7% of the United States (1:2,891), 8.0% of Brazil (1:5,052), 2.7% of France (1:4,987), 2.0% of South Africa (1:5,431) and 1.2% of Canada (1:6,120).

In Germany, the frequency of the surname was higher than the national average (1:287) in the following states:
 1. Saarland (1:84)
 2. Rhineland-Palatinate (1:123)
 3. Hesse (1:159)
 4. North Rhine-Westphalia (1:226)
 5. Saxony-Anhalt (1:248)

People

Surname
Alan Becker (born 1989), U.S. animator, YouTuber
Alan S. Becker (1946–2020), American lawyer and politician
Albert Becker (disambiguation), multiple people
Albrecht Becker (1906–2002), German production designer, photographer, actor, imprisoned by the Nazis for homosexuality
Alfred Becker, German engineer and military officer
Alfred G. Becker, American politician
Alice Becker-Ho (born 1941), French poet
Alisson Becker (born 1992), Brazilian footballer
Annika Becker (born 1981), German pole vaulter
Armando Becker (born 1966), Venezuelan basketball player
August Becker (1900–1967), German chemist
August Becker (1821–1887), German painter
August Becker (1828–1891), German author
B. Jay Becker (1904–1987), U.S. bridge player
Ben Becker (born 1964), German film and theatre actor
Benjamin Becker (born 1981), German tennis player
Bernard Becker (1920–2013), U.S. ophthalmologist
Bertha Becker (1920–2013), Brazilian geographer
Bill Becker (1916–2010), U.S. journalist, writer and world traveler
Bo Becker (born 1971), Swedish economist
Boris Becker (born 1967), German tennis player; youngest Wimbledon champion at age 17
Britta Becker (born 1973), German field hockey player
Carl Becker (disambiguation), multiple people
Carl Lotus Becker (1873–1945), U.S. historian, author; President of American Historical Association in 1931
Charles Becker (1870–1915), first U.S. police officer executed for murder
Charlotte Becker (born 1983), German racing cyclist
Christiane Luise Amalie Becker (1778–1797), German actress
Christine Becker, U.S. women's saber team member
Cole Becker (born 1995), lead singer of SWMRS
Cornelius Becker, German theologian (see Becker Psalter)
Cory Becker, U.S. guitar player (rock band: Living Things, St. Louis, MO)
Craig Becker (born 1956), U.S. labor attorney and professor of law
David Becker, U.S. guitarist
Diane M. Becker (1943–2021), U.S. nurse and public health scientist 
Dietrich Becker (1620–1670), German Baroque violinist and composer
Dirk Becker (born 1966), German politician (SPD)
Donna Becker (born 1932), All-American Girls Professional Baseball League ballplayer
Douglas Becker, U.S./Belgian choreographer, teacher
Edmund Becker (born 1957), German footballer
Edward R. Becker (1933–2006), U.S. appeals court judge
Elisabeth Becker (1923–1946), German SS concentration camp guard executed for war crimes, World War II
Elizabeth Becker (born 1969), U.S. journalist and author
Emma Becker (born 1988), French writer
Ernest Becker (1924–1974), U.S. cultural anthropologist
Felicitas Becker, professor of African history
Franz Becker (born 1918), German footballer
Gary Becker (1930–2014), U.S. Nobel Prize-winning economist
Gavin de Becker (born 1954), U.S. specialist: security
George Ferdinand Becker (1847–1919), U.S. geologist
Germán Becker (born 1980), Argentinian tango musician
Gustav Becker (1819–1885), German clockmaker and businessman
Gustavo Adolfo Becker (born 1966), Spanish high jumper
Gustavo Adolfo Bécquer (1836–1870), Spanish poet
Hans-Josef Becker (born 1948), German Catholic archbishop of Paderborn
Hartmut Becker (1938-2022), German actor
Heidi Becker (disambiguation), multiple people
Heinrich Becker (1770–1822), German actor
Heinz Becker (1915–1991), German baseball player
Hellmuth Becker (1902–1953), German Nazi Waffen-SS general executed for war crimes
Helmut Becker (1927–1990), German viticulturist
Herbert L. Becker (born 1956), U.S. magician and founder of IPTV
Hermann Becker (born 1887), German World War I fighter ace
Hermann Heinrich Becker, German painter
Howard P. Becker (1899–1960), U.S. sociologist
Howard S. Becker (born 1928), U.S. sociologist and musician
Hugo Becker (1863–1941), German cellist, teacher and composer
Hugo Becker, French actor from Metz
Ingrid Becker (born 1942), German athlete
Jacques Becker (1906–1960), French screenwriter and film director
Jakob Becker (1810–1872), German genre painter
Jean Becker (born 1938), French director, screenwriter, and actor
Jean Becker (1833–1884), German violinist and composer
Jens Becker (born 1965), German metal bass guitarist
Jill Becker, American psychological researcher
Julie Becker (1972–2016), American artist
Jurek Becker (1937–1997), German writer
Jürgen Becker (comedian) (born 1959), German cabaret artist
Konrad Becker (born 1959), Austrian hypermedia researcher and interdisciplinary content developer
Kuno Becker (born 1978), Mexican actor
Kurt Becker (born 1958), U.S. football player
Lawrence C. Becker (born 1939), U.S. academic, philosopher
Leonard F. Becker (1920–1991), American politician
Ludwig Becker (disambiguation), multiple people
Lydia Becker (1827–1890), British suffragist and amateur scientist
Marc Becker, U.S. professor of Latin American studies
Marcus Becker (born 1981), German slalom canoer
Markus Becker (pianist) (born 1963), German pianist and academic teacher
Margaret Becker (born 1959), U.S. award-winning composer, singer, speaker and writer
Mariana Becker (born early 1970s), Brazilian sports journalist and television reporter
Martin Becker (1916–2006), German Luftwaffe night fighter ace
May Lamberton Becker (1873–1958), U.S. journalist and literary critic
Max Becker (1888-1960), German politician
Meret Becker (born 1969), German actress and singer
Mike Becker (born 1943), U.S. bridge player
Miriam Becker (1909–2000), American mathematician
Moritz Becker (1827–?), U.S. Deputy Sheriff and Democratic politician (WI)
Muriel Gustavo Becker (born 1987), Brazilian goalkeeper
Murilo Becker (born 1983), Brazilian basketball player
Nate Becker (born 1996), American football player
Nikolaus Becker (1809–1845), German lawyer and writer known for "Rheinlied"
Oskar Becker (1839–1868), German student, shot King William I of Prussia
Oskar Becker (1889–1964), German philosopher, logician, mathematician, historian of mathematics
Otto Heinrich Enoch Becker (1828–1890), German ophthalmologist
Paul Becker (born 1984), Canadian actor, director, choreographer and producer
Paula Modersohn-Becker (1876–1907), German expressionist painter
Philip Becker (1830–1898), U.S. Republican politician
Rafael Becker (born 1991), Brazilian Professional Golfer, PGA Tour player and winner of the Brazilian Open
Ralf Becker (born 1970), German footballer, coach and administrator
Ralph Elihu Becker (1907–1994), U.S. attorney and ambassador to Honduras 1976–1977
Ralph Elihu Becker (born 1952), U.S. attorney and Republican politician; 34th Mayor of Salt Lake City, UT
Rich Becker (born 1972), U.S. baseball player
 Robert Becker, son of Russell, founder of Becker Film Group, an Australian film company
Robert O. Becker (1923–2008), U.S. orthopedic surgeon and electrophysiology researcher
Roger Becker (born 1934), British tennis player
Rudolf Becker (1923–1944), German highly decorated Hauptmann in World War II; recipient of Knight's Cross of the Iron Cross
Rudolph Zacharias Becker (1752–1822), German educator and author
 Russell Becker, founder of the Becker Group, Australian independent film and television distribution company
Ruth Becker (1899–1990), U.S. schoolteacher (Kansas) and Titanic survivor
Sally Becker, British volunteer in Bosnia and Kosovo
Samuel William Becker, U.S. dermatologist who documented Becker's nevus
Sandra Becker (born 1967), German artist
Sandra Lynne Becker (born 1947), U.S. beauty queen; Miss California 1965
Sandy Becker (1922–1996), U.S. television announcer, actor and comedian
Sean Becker (born 1975), New Zealand curler
Sherburn M. Becker (1876–1949), U.S. Republican politician (41st Mayor of Milwaukee, WI); elected at age 29 and known as the boy mayor
Simon Fisher-Becker (born 1961), British actor
Sheraldo Becker (born 1995), Surinamese footballer
Theodor Becker (1840–1928), German civil engineer and entomologist
Thorsten Becker (born 1980), German footballer
Thomas Becker (disambiguation), multiple people
Valentin Eduard Becker (1814–1890), German composer
Vaneta Becker, U.S. Republican politician 
Walt Becker (born 1968), U.S. director, writer, and actor
Walter Becker (1950–2017), U.S. musician, songwriter and record producer
Wayland Becker (1910–1984), U.S. football player
Wilhelm Adolf Becker (1796–1846), German archaeologist
Wilhelm Gottlieb Becker (1753–1813), German archaeologist and author
William D. Becker (1876–1943), U.S. attorney and Republican politician (43rd mayor of St. Louis, Missouri); died in the crash of Waco CG-4 glider's first public demonstration
William W. Becker, American hotelier, co-founder of Motel 6
Wolfgang Becker (1910–2005), German film director and film editor
Wolfgang Becker (born 1954), German film director and screenwriter

Middle name
Herman Becker Fast (1887–1938), American businessman, farmer, and politician
Sara Becker da Silva (2005-...), Brazilian theologian

See also
Beckers, surname

References

German-language surnames
Occupational surnames

fr:Becker